Aivis Ronis (born 20 May 1968) is a Latvian diplomat and politician and was Minister for Foreign Affairs of Latvia from 29 April 2010 to 3 November 2010, from 2011 to 2013 he was Minister for Transport of Latvia. From June 2000 to September 2004 he was the Latvian ambassador to the United States.

References

1968 births
Living people
People from Kuldīga
Ministers of Foreign Affairs of Latvia
Transport ministers of Latvia
Ambassadors of Latvia to the United States
Latvian diplomats
University of Latvia alumni
Recipients of the Order of the Cross of Terra Mariana, 2nd Class
Permanent Representatives of Latvia to NATO
Fulbright alumni